Thomas Cushing (1725–1788) was an American lawyer, merchant and statesman from Boston, Massachusetts.

Thomas Cushing may also refer to:
 Thomas Cushing II (1694–1746), American merchant, lawyer and politician in Massachusetts
 Thomas Forbes Cushing (1838–1902), American member of Boston, New York, and Newport society during the Gilded Age
 Thomas Humphrey Cushing (1755–1822), American army officer and collector of customs
 Tom Cushing (1879–1941), American playwright